Gülhane Park ("Rosehouse Park") is a historical urban park in the Eminönü district of Istanbul, Turkey; it is adjacent to and on the grounds of the Topkapı Palace. The south entrance of the park sports one of the larger gates of the palace.   It is the oldest and one of the most expansive public parks in Istanbul.

History 
The namesake of the park, the Gülhane ("Rosehouse") present on the grounds, was the place where the 1839 Edict of Gülhane ( or Gülhane Hatt-ı Şerif-î) was proclaimed. The edict launched the Tanzimat reforms in the Ottoman Empire, which modernized the empire and included changes such as the equalization of all Ottoman citizens, regardless of religion, before the law. The proclamation was made by Grand Vizier Mustafa Reşid Pasha, a leading statesman, diplomat, and reformer in the Empire.

Gülhane Park was once part of the outer garden of Topkapı Palace and mainly consisted of a grove. A section of the outer garden was planned as a park by the municipality and opened to the public in 1912. The park previously contained recreation areas, coffee houses, playgrounds etc. Later, a small zoo was opened within the park.

The park underwent a major renovation in recent years; the removal of the zoo, fun fair and picnic grounds effecting an increase in open space. The excursion routes were re-arranged and the big pool was renovated in a modern style. With concrete structures removed the park regained the natural landscape of the 1950s, revealing trees dating from the 1800s.

The Museum of The History of Science and Technology in Islam is located in the former stables of Topkapı Palace, on the western edge of the park. It was opened in May 2008 by the Turkish Prime Minister Recep Tayyip Erdogan. The museum features 140 replicas of inventions of the 8th to 16th centuries, from astronomy, geography, chemistry, surveying, optics, medicine, architecture, physics and warfare.

The Procession Kiosk (Alay Köşkü in Turkish) sits on the outer wall of the park overlooking the tramway and is accessible from inside the park. It contains the Ahmet Hamdi Tanpınar Museum Library.

Future
The old barracks within the area of Gülhane is expected to be converted to a cultural center in due course; the center will host a library and exhibition hall together with a workshop on kilim and handicrafts.

See also
 Ottoman architecture
Turkish Ministry of Culture and Tourism - Gülhane Park

References

Literature 

 Fanny Davis. Palace of Topkapi in Istanbul. 1970. ASIN B000NP64Z2

External links 

 Images of Gülhane Park

Parks in Istanbul
Topkapı Palace
Fatih
Urban public parks